Most British Forces Post Offices (or BFPOs for short) have issued postal orders.  BFPOs are located in British military bases around the world. Postal Orders issued at BFPOs enable members of the armed forces to purchase items by mail order and to send money home.

Collecting

Postal Orders issued by BFPOs are sought after by collectors because many BFPOs are only open for a short time and access to them may be restricted to military personnel.

See also

Field post office
The Postal Order Society

British Armed Forces
Currencies of the United Kingdom
Postal orders
Postal system of the United Kingdom